The women's 1000 metres races of the 2015–16 ISU Speed Skating World Cup 5, arranged in the Sørmarka Arena in Stavanger, Norway, were held on 29 and 30 January 2016.

Jorien ter Mors of the Netherlands won race one, while Brittany Bowe of the United States came second, and Marrit Leenstra of the Netherlands came third. Anice Das of the Netherlands won the first Division B race.

In race two, Bowe won before Leenstra, while Vanessa Bittner of Austria finished in third place. Janine Smit of the Netherlands won the second Division B race.

Race 1
Race one took place on Friday, 29 January, with Division B scheduled in the morning session, at 12:19, and Division A scheduled in the afternoon session, at 17:10.

Division A

Division B

Race 2
Race two took place on Saturday, 30 January, with Division B scheduled in the morning session, at 10:25, and Division A scheduled in the afternoon session, at 14:55.

Division A

Division B

References

Women 1000
5